First-seeded Nancye Wynne defeated Thelma Coyne 5–7, 6–4, 6–0 in the final to win the women's singles tennis title at the 1940 Australian Championships.

Seeds
The seeded players are listed below. Nancye Wynne is the champion; others show the round in which they were eliminated.

 Nancye Wynne (champion)
 Thelma Coyne (finalist)
 Nell Hopman (semifinals)
 May Hardcastle (quarterfinals)
 Joan Hartigan (semifinals)
 Alison Hattersley (quarterfinals)
 Gwen O'Halloran (quarterfinals)
 Constance Coate (quarterfinals)

Draw

Key
 Q = Qualifier
 WC = Wild card
 LL = Lucky loser
 r = Retired

Finals

Earlier rounds

Section 1

Section 2

Notes and references
Notes

References

External links
 

1940 in women's tennis
1940
1940 in Australian women's sport
Women's Singles